Yucatan Landing is an unincorporated community in Tensas Parish in northeastern Louisiana, United States.

Notes

Unincorporated communities in Tensas Parish, Louisiana
Unincorporated communities in Louisiana